Arundel and Shoreham was a borough constituency of the House of Commons of the Parliament of the United Kingdom.

It was created for the 1950 general election, and abolished for the February 1974 general election, when it was divided to create the constituencies of Arundel and Shoreham.

Members of Parliament

Boundaries
 1950–1970: The Municipal Borough of Arundel; the Urban Districts of Littlehampton, Shoreham-by-Sea, and Southwick; and the Rural Districts of Chanctonbury, and Worthing.
 1970–1974: The Municipal Borough of Arundel; the Urban Districts of Bognor Regis, and Littlehampton; and parts of the Rural Districts of Chichester, and Worthing.

Election results

Elections in the 1950s

Elections in the 1960s

Elections in the 1970s

References 

Parliamentary constituencies in South East England (historic)
Constituencies of the Parliament of the United Kingdom established in 1950
Constituencies of the Parliament of the United Kingdom disestablished in 1974
Arundel
Shoreham-by-Sea
1950 establishments in England
1974 disestablishments in England